The Music Show is an early American television program which was broadcast on the now defunct DuMont Television Network from May 1953 to October 1954.

Broadcast history
The series ran from May 1953 to October 1954. The show was a musical program broadcast live from WGN-TV in Chicago, featuring the vocal talents of Mike Douglas, Henri Noel, Eleanor Warner, Jackie Van, and (in 1954) Dolores Peterson.

Robert Trendler conducted a 34-piece orchestra. The Music Show  originally aired Tuesday nights at 9 (EST) on most DuMont affiliates. The series moved to 8:30 in July, and to 10:30 on Wednesday nights in October. In January 1954, The Music Show began airing at 10:00. Finally, from September to October 1954, the program was broadcast on Sundays at 10 PM.

The Music Show was only one of several DuMont Network series to be broadcast from Chicago; others included The Al Morgan Show, Concert Tonight, Chicagoland Mystery Players, Music From Chicago, They Stand Accused, This Is Music, Windy City Jamboree, and the Emmy-nominated game show Down You Go. All of these series were broadcast from DuMont affiliate WGN-TV over the DuMont Network.

See also
List of programs broadcast by the DuMont Television Network
List of surviving DuMont Television Network broadcasts
This Is Music
Music From Chicago
Concert Tonight

References

Bibliography
David Weinstein, The Forgotten Network: DuMont and the Birth of American Television (Philadelphia: Temple University Press, 2004) 
Alex McNeil, Total Television, Fourth edition (New York: Penguin Books, 1980) 
Tim Brooks and Earle Marsh, The Complete Directory to Prime Time Network TV Shows, Third edition (New York: Ballantine Books, 1964)

External links

DuMont historical website

DuMont Television Network original programming
1953 American television series endings
1954 American television series endings
Black-and-white American television shows
English-language television shows
Lost television shows